Khairahani is a municipality in Chitwan District in Bagmati Province of southern Nepal. The municipality was established on 8 May 2014 by merging the existing Khairahani, Kumroj and Chainpur VDCs. At the time of the 1991 Nepal census it had a population of 13,629 people living in 2262 households.

Demographics
At the time of the 2011 Nepal census, Khairahani Municipality had a population of 56,925. Of these, 60.2% spoke Nepali, 25.8% Tharu, 4.9% Darai, 2.7% Tamang, 2.1% Bhojpuri, 1.0% Magar, 0.9% Newar, 0.7% Gurung, 0.6% Maithili, 0.4% Hindi, 0.3% Chepang, 0.2% Bote, 0.1% Kham, 0.1% Urdu and 0.1% other languages as their first language.

In terms of ethnicity/caste, 27.1% were Tharu, 25.7% Hill Brahmin, 14.1% Chhetri, 5.2% Darai, 4.3% Magar, 4.3% Tamang, 4.0% Newar, 3.0% Kami, 2.8% Gurung, 1.7% Damai/Dholi, 1.2% Musalman, 0.6% Kanu, 0.5% Bote, 0.5% Chepang/Praja, 0.5% Sanyasi/Dasnami, 0.5% Sarki, 0.4% Gharti/Bhujel, 0.3% Gaine, 0.3% Kumal, 0.3% Thakuri, 0.2% Dusadh/Pasawan/Pasi, 0.2% Majhi, 0.2% Musahar, 0.2% Rai, 0.2% Teli, 0.1% Chamar/Harijan/Ram, 0.1% Ghale, 0.1% Hajam/Thakur, 0.1% Halwai, 0.1% Kalwar, 0.1% Kathabaniyan, 0.1% Koiri/Kushwaha, 0.1% Mallaha, 0.1% other Terai, 0.1% Yadav and 0.1% others.

In terms of religion, 89.7% were Hindu, 6.1% Buddhist, 2.5% Christian, 1.2% Muslim, 0.1% Prakriti and 0.4% others.

References

Populated places in Chitwan District
Municipalities in Bagmati Province
Nepal municipalities established in 2014